East Bernard High School is a public high school located in East Bernard, Texas (USA) and classified as a 3A school by the UIL.  It is part of the East Bernard Independent School District located in northeast Wharton County.  In 2015, the school was rated "Met Standard" by the Texas Education Agency.

Athletics
The East Bernard Brahmas compete in these sports - 

Cross Country, Volleyball, Football, Basketball, Powerlifting, Golf, Tennis, Track, Softball, Baseball & Swimming

State titles
Baseball - 
1994(2A), 1995(2A)
Boys Cross Country - 
2009(2A)
Girls Cross Country - 
2015(3A), 2017(3A)
Football - 
1977(1A), 2012(2A/D2)
Softball - 
2008(2A), 2015(3A)
Volleyball - 
1973(1A), 1975(1A)+, 1975(1A)^, 1976(1A), 1980(3A), 1982(2A), 1983(2A), 1984(2A), 1988(2A), 1989(2A), 1990(2A), 1992(2A), 1993(2A)

+ Spring

^ Fall (Volleyball changed to a fall sport in 1975)

State Finalists
Football - 
1982(2A)
Volleyball - 
1972(1A), 1974(1A), 1986(2A)

Notable alumni
 Shane Lechler - NFL punter for the Houston Texans.  He is regarded as perhaps the greatest in the history of the NFL. 
 Michael Bankston - Former Defensive Tackle / Defensive End for NFL Phoenix Cardinals/Arizona Cardinals and Cincinnati Bengals.

References

External links
 

Schools in Wharton County, Texas
Public high schools in Texas